Haguro (羽黒) was a  heavy cruiser of the Imperial Japanese Navy, named after Mount Haguro in Yamagata Prefecture. Commissioned in 1929, Haguro saw significant service during World War II, participating in nine naval engagements. She was sunk in 1945 during a fight with Royal Navy destroyers, one of the last major Japanese warships to be sunk in open waters during World War II.

Design
They carried two aircraft and their main armament was ten  guns in five twin turrets. At the time they were built, this was the heaviest armament of any cruiser class in the world.

Construction and career

Haguro was laid down at the Mitsubishi shipyard in Nagasaki on 16 March 1925, launched and named on 24 March 1928, and was commissioned into the Imperial Navy on 25 April 1929.

Between 1931 and 1933 she was commanded by Nomura Naokuni who subsequently achieved flag rank.

Her service in World War II started in the Dutch East Indies, where she engaged the enemy off Makassar on 8 February 1942. Haguro then played a key role in the Battle of the Java Sea on 27 February 1942, first sinking the destroyer  and then later the same day the Allied fleet's flagship, the cruiser ; both by torpedo. Two days later, on 1 March 1942 in another action south of Borneo,  Haguro took part in the sinking of the cruiser  and the destroyer .

On 7 May 1942, she participated in the Battle of the Coral Sea, moving on to the Solomon Islands where she took part in the Battle of the Eastern Solomons on 24 August 1942, the evacuation from Guadalcanal at the end of January 1943. Haguro took light damage in the Battle of Empress Augusta Bay on 2 November 1943. On 19 June 1944, she survived the Battle of the Philippine Sea, and from 23–25 October 1944 she took light damage in the Battle of Leyte Gulf.

Battle of the Malacca Strait and fate

In May 1945, Haguro was the target of the British "Operation Dukedom" and was ambushed. The 26th Destroyer Flotilla found her with the destroyer  just after midnight on 16 May 1945, and began the attack. During the battle, Kamikaze was lightly damaged, but Haguro was hit by gunfire and three Mark IX torpedoes from the British destroyers. She soon began to slow down and took a 30-degree list to port.

Rear Admiral Sugiura was posthumously promoted to vice admiral on 16 May. Haguro was the last major Japanese warship to be sunk in a surface action during the war.

Haguro was stricken from the navy list on 20 June 1945.

Shipwreck
The wreck sits upright, covered in places by discarded trawler nets with her hull opposite her forward turrets buried in the seabed to about her original waterline, but this level gradually reduces until at the stern her outer propellers and shafts are actually up above the seabed. Her foremast and the top half of the bridge structure are missing/collapsed. Her mainmast is collapsed. Her funnels are missing. British hits are visible in places. The bow section forward of No. 2 turret is badly damaged by torpedo hits. Haguros No. 1 turret and barbette are uprooted and lie against the hull, the rear of the turret on the starboard sea bed and the barrels pointing vertically towards the surface. Her No. 2 turret is trained to starboard at approximately the 1 o'clock position, with its roof collapsed and both barrels and breeches missing, as they were not replaced after being damaged by a bomb at the earlier Battle of Leyte Gulf. Her No. 3 turret's guns are askew and trained to the port quarter at the 8 o'clock position. Both her stern main turrets' guns point almost directly astern. Just behind the No. 5 turret, the wreck is broken in half, although the very stern section is still "partially" attached and heavily damaged on the port side.

In 2010 a further diving expedition surveyed the wreck in detail. In 2014 the wreck was among five located in the region reported to have been heavily destroyed by illegal salvors.

Notes

References

Books

External links

Haguro's history in detail

Myōkō-class cruisers
Ships built by Mitsubishi Heavy Industries
1928 ships
Cruisers of the Imperial Japanese Navy
World War II cruisers of Japan
World War II shipwrecks in the Strait of Malacca
Maritime incidents in May 1945
2003 archaeological discoveries